National Highway 149B, commonly called NH 149B is a national highway in  India. It is a spur road of National Highway 49. NH-149B traverses the state of Chhattisgarh in India.

Route 
Saragaon, Champa, Korba, Chhuri, Katghora. The wiki map needs correction to match official NHAI

Junctions  
 
  Terminal near Saragaon .
  near Urga.
  Terminal near Katghora.

See also 

 List of National Highways in India
 List of National Highways in India by state

References

External links 

 NH 149B on OpenStreetMap

National highways in India
National Highways in Chhattisgarh